This is a list of members (MSPs) returned to the third Scottish Parliament at the 2007 Scottish Parliament election. Of the 129 MSPs, 73 were elected from first past the post constituencies with a further 56 members being returned from eight regions, each electing seven MSPs as a form of mixed member proportional representation.

The 2007 Scottish Parliament election produced another hung parliament which saw the Scottish National Party replace Scottish Labour as the largest party group in the Parliament. On 16 May 2007, the Scottish Parliament elected Alex Salmond as First Minister of Scotland. The next day, Salmond officially took office after being sworn in at the Court of Session and went on to form the Parliament's first minority administration.

Composition 

Government parties denoted with bullets (•)

Graphical representation
These are graphical representations of the Scottish Parliament showing a comparison of party strengths as it was directly after the 2007 Scottish Parliament election and its composition at the time of its dissolution in March 2011:

  

Note this is not the official seating plan of the Scottish Parliament.

List of MSPs
This is a list of MSPs at dissolution. The changes table below records all changes in party affiliation during the session. See here a list of MSPs elected in the 2007 election.

Former MSPs

Changes

See also
 Executive of the 3rd Scottish Parliament
 2007 Scottish Parliament election
 Scottish Parliament
 Member of the Scottish Parliament

References

External links
 Scottish Parliament website
 Current and previous Members of the Scottish Parliament (MSPs), on the Scottish Parliament website

3